Quercus germana, the Mexican royal oak, is a species of oak tree in the family Fagaceae. It is native to mountain cloud forests in eastern Mexico. It is placed in section Quercus.

Description
Quercus germana is a small to medium-sized tree, and can reach  in height.

As with other white oaks (subgenus Quercus, section Quercus) its acorns mature in a single season.

Habitat and range
Quercus germana is endemic to eastern and northeastern Mexico, in Sierra Madre Oriental of (north to south) Tamaulipas, San Luis Potosí, Querétaro, Veracruz, Hidalgo, and Puebla states, and the Sierra Madre de Oaxaca of Puebla, Veracruz, and Oaxaca states.

It is generally sparse throughout its range. It is often associated with the trees Quercus lancifolia, Quercus pinnativenulosa, Platanus sp., and Alnus sp.

The species has an area of occupancy (AOO) of 500 km2. The species has been under-sampled so the AOO is likely an under-estimate, but not likely to exceed 2,375 km2.

Conservation
It is an IUCN Red List least concern species, threatened by habitat loss.

References

External links
SFA Gardens.edu: Quercus germana — Royal Oak

germana
Endemic oaks of Mexico
Trees of Hidalgo (state)
Trees of Oaxaca
Trees of Puebla
Trees of Querétaro
Trees of San Luis Potosí
Trees of Tamaulipas
Trees of Veracruz
Plants described in 1830
Flora of the Sierra Madre Oriental
Flora of the Sierra Madre de Oaxaca
Taxonomy articles created by Polbot
Cloud forest flora of Mexico